Ramón Cora (23 November 1929 – 21 January 2014) was a Cuban rower. He competed in the men's coxed four event at the 1948 Summer Olympics.

References

External links
 

1929 births
2014 deaths
Cuban male rowers
Olympic rowers of Cuba
Rowers at the 1948 Summer Olympics
Sportspeople from Havana